Live from Daryl's House (simply known as Daryl's House and often abbreviated as LFDH) is an online music series that debuted in the autumn of 2007. The show features singer-songwriter Daryl Hall performing with his band and various guest artists at his home in Millerton, New York. The show provides a performance space that is an alternative to live concerts and studio sessions for popular artists. This allows the artists to "…have fun and [be] creatively spontaneous". The majority of shows include a segment in which Hall and the guest artist prepare food from different cuisines for everyone to eat. The food comes from various local restaurants and the chefs of those establishments walk Hall and guest through the preparation of the food.

Originally a web series, Live from Daryl's House expanded to broadcast TV but remained unchanged. Hall was quoted by Billboard.com as saying "it's an Internet show that is being shown on television, so I'm not adapting the show at all in any way to be a 'TV' show." The show debuted in 95 markets on September 24, 2011, with back-to-back half-hour episodes featuring Train (Episode 33) and Fitz and the Tantrums (Episode 35). Starting with the 66th episode, the shows are filmed at Hall's club, Daryl's House, in Pawling, New York.

History 
The first web show was a solo production which featured Hall and his backing band playing "Everything Your Heart Desires". It was not until the second episode that the show introduced its guest star format. Hall's long-time performing and songwriting partner John Oates (of the band Hall & Oates) was the first guest on the show with a Christmas episode entitled "Trimming the Tree".

Hall created Live from Daryl's House as a refuge from live touring on the road. He stated in an interview with Rolling Stone magazine that he wanted to bring the world to him, for a change. Hall wanted the opportunity to collaborate with contemporary artists, and this is his vehicle in which to do so.

Live from Daryl's House originally appeared on the program's website in November 2007. The initial episode was completely funded by Hall. In subsequent shows, costs were defrayed by corporate sponsors like Uline. Although some of those sponsored episodes are no longer available for viewing on the archive section of LFDH's website, they can still be found on YouTube and torrent trackers. In addition to corporate sponsorship, Hall routinely plugged local restaurants that provided catering for the shows. Often, the chef would teach Hall and the guest artist how to prepare at least one of the dishes that were served. When the program gained popularity, Hall's Good Cop Bad Cop Productions company signed two syndication deals (with Tribune being the most notable). In 2012, the Viacom-owned Palladia network took over the finances with help from a deal arranged by executive producer Jonathan Wolfson (Hall & Oates manager).

In July 2018, BMG announced a new partnership with Live from Daryl's House. The agreement included worldwide rights to the entire 82-episode collection filmed from 2007 to 2016. The show's new production began in the fall of 2018 and was executive produced by Daryl Hall and Jonathan Wolfson for Good Cop Bad Cop Productions, and Joe Thomas and Bob Frank for BMG. Domenic Cotter of Sound Off Productions continued as the show's producer.

Episodes 
As of November 2020, 84 episodes of Live from Daryl's House have been filmed.

2014

2013

2012

2011

2010

2009

2008

2007

Syndication 
Live from Daryl's House gained traction on Rural Media Group's channels, and the Palladia network through a deal brokered by the show's Executive Producer Jonathan Wolfson, Rick Krim (VH1), and Ben Zurier (Executive Vice President, Programming Strategy, VH1, VH1 Classic, Palladia).
The show currently continues to air on VH1, MTV Live (formerly Palladia) (Viacom Media Network), RFD-TV and Family Net (both of the Rural Media Group), and on the Live from Daryl's House website. The show's website continues to premier the latest episodes from the series, and holds an archive of some of the past episodes. In an announced agreement, 2014 will see the show continue to air on Viacom Media Network's Palladia music channel  and new episodes will appear on all previously mentioned outlets.
The series has led to Daryl Hall touring a live version of the show with Sharon Jones and Allen Stone, among others.

On LFDH.com, the CeeLo Green song "Forget You" (explicitly entitled "Fuck You") was unedited on the website, but was heavily edited on Palladia and RFD-TV airings.

The "House" 
From the inception of the show until the 64th episode, Live from Daryl's House primarily took place at Hall's home in Millerton, New York. This home consisted of two Connecticut Valley Houses that were built between 1771 and 1781. These houses were disassembled in their original locations and shipped to Millerton, New York where they were reassembled back into their original structures and preserved. The houses now sit as one on Hall's 250 acres of farmland, which is located on the New York/Connecticut border 50 miles to the west of their original location.

Episode 64 was the last show to be filmed from Hall's Millerton, New York, residence. In October 2013, Hall began leasing and renovating the Pawling building that once housed the Towne Crier nightclub in Pawling, New York. Having remodeled the venue to look like his old home, even naming it Daryl's House, the 65th episode of Live from Daryl's House was filmed at the new location.

Long known for his passion of restoring historical homes, Hall produced another television show titled Daryl's Restoration Over-Hall.  This series appeared on DIY Network and was executive produced by Hall, Michael Morrissey and Jonathan Wolfson. The show focused on restoring Hall's colonial-era home in Sherman, Connecticut.

Other locations 
Episode 4 of the series was filmed at Hall's London Townhouse where he performs "Let's Give Them Something to Talk About" with K.T. Tunstall.

Episode 6 was filmed at the SXSW Austin, TX.

Episodes 28 and 29 were filmed in Jamaica.

Episode 40 was filmed at Todd Rundgren's home in Hawaii.

Episode 69 (Sammy Hagar) was filmed at the Cabo Wabo in Cabo San Lucas, Mexico.

Band members 
The house band consists of Hall and a core of key members along with several guest musicians based on the genre of the guest star. The late T-Bone Wolk was the musical director. After Wolk's death in 2010, guitarist Paul Pesco was the musical director until early 2014. Hall replaced Pesco as musical director with guitarist Shane Theriot.

From the first episode, Wolk's house musicians were guitarist/keyboardist Eliot Lewis, drummer Shawn Pelton, percussionist Everett Bradley, and bassist Zev Katz, who frequently ended episodes with a "Moment of Zev." Through Pesco's tenure and into Theriot's, the band coalesced around Lewis, drummer Brian Dunne, bassist Klyde Jones, and percussionist Porter Carroll. Dunne, Jones, and Lewis played together in the Average White Band in the 2000s. A frequent guest throughout the series is saxophonist Charles DeChant.

In 2022, the band toured under the name Daryl Hall and the Daryl's House Band.

Awards 
In 2010, Live from Daryl's House won the "Best Variety Series" from the Webby Awards Group. The series was also nominated for a Music Webby in the same year.
The show won a MTV O Music Award in 2010 for "Best Performance Series".

References

External links 
 
 

VH1 music shows
2000s American musical comedy television series
2010s American musical comedy television series
2000s American variety television series
2010s American variety television series
2007 American television series debuts
Television shows set in New York City
American comedy web series